The INSPIRE Women Act was introduced in the United States House of Representatives on January 5, 2017 by Representative Barbara Comstock of Virginia. The bill compels the director of the National Aeronautics and Space Administration (NASA) to encourage women and girls to pursue an education in the science, technology, engineering, and mathematics (STEM) fields.

The act additionally compels the NASA administrator to support the following initiatives:
NASA GIRLS and NASA BOYS, which are virtual mentoring programs that pair NASA mentors with young students.
Aspire to Inspire, a program that tasks young girls to investigate STEM career opportunities by providing information about the lives and jobs of early career women at NASA.
Summer Institute in Science, Technology, Engineering, and Research. This program is designed to increase awareness of nontraditional career opportunities with the Goddard Space Flight Center among middle school students.

Lastly, the act requires the NASA administrator to present a report to the House Committee on Commerce, Science, and Transportation on how NASA can best engage current and retired astronauts, scientists, engineers, and other personnel to work with K-12 female STEM students to inspire the next generation of women to consider studying STEM fields and pursue careers in aerospace.

The bill was signed into law by President Donald Trump on February 28, 2017.

References

Acts of the 115th United States Congress